Benzoin may refer to:

Benzoin (organic compound), an organic compound with the formula PhCH(OH)C(O)Ph 
Benzoin (resin), a balsamic resin obtained from the bark of several species of trees in the genus Styrax
Benzoin aldolase, an enzyme that catalyzes the chemical reaction benzoin to benzaldehyde
Benzoin condensation, a reaction between two aromatic aldehydes
Benzoin odoriferum or Lindera benzoin, a shrub in the laurel family
Benzoin tree, the common name of Styrax, a genus of shrubs or trees in the family Styracaceae 
Tincture of benzoin, a pungent solution of benzoin resin in ethanol

See also
C14H12O2, molecular formula of benzoin
Benzene (C6H6), organic chemical compound of hydrocarbon class
Benzoic acid (or C6H5COOH), colorless crystalline solid and aromatic carboxylic acid